Fieldon is a village in Jersey County, Illinois, United States. As of the 2020 census, the village had a total population of 176. The village's current mayor is Julia Dixon.

Geography
Fieldon is located at  (39.108184, -90.500048).

Demographics

As of the census of 2000, there were 271 people, 103 households, and 79 families residing in the village. The racial makeup of the village was 100.00% White. Hispanic or Latino of any race were 1.11% of the population.

There were 103 households, out of which 31.1% had children under the age of 18 living with them, 66.0% were married couples living together, 5.8% had a female householder with no husband present, and 23.3% were non-families. 18.4% of all households were made up of individuals, and 10.7% had someone living alone who was 65 years of age or older.  The average household size was 2.63 and the average family size was 3.04.

In the village, the population was spread out, with 26.2% under the age of 18, 5.9% from 18 to 24, 29.5% from 25 to 44, 21.8% from 45 to 64, and 16.6% who were 65 years of age or older. The median age was 37 years. For every 100 females, there were 102.2 males.  For every 100 females age 18 and over, there were 100.0 males.

The median income for a household in the village was $38,393, and the median income for a family was $40,156. Males had a median income of $32,250 versus $19,583 for females. The per capita income for the village was $14,811.  None of the families and 0.8% of the population were living below the poverty line.

Education
Fieldon is served by the public K-12 Jersey Community Unit School District 100. Fieldon Elementary School was located in the village until 2012, when it was permanently closed due to district realignment.

References

Villages in Jersey County, Illinois
Villages in Illinois